The Coral Reef Alliance (CORAL) is an environmental non-profit, non-governmental organization based in Oakland, California that is dedicated to coral reef conservation. CORAL operates at the local, regional, and global levels to reduce threats to reefs and ensure that reefs can adapt to climate change.

History
The organization was founded in 1994 by Stephen Colwell.

Programs 
CORAL's work includes educating local communities and building alliances with governments, agencies, research institutions, and other NGOs to protect coral reefs. Locally, CORAL's priorities are to maintain clean water, healthy fisheries, and protected habitat.

On a regional level, CORAL focuses on reef regions in Hawai'i (Hawai‘i Island and Maui), Honduras and Mexico.

Globally, CORAL researches conservation strategies and informs scientists and policy makers. Additionally, CORAL is currently developing a coral bleaching response network using high-resolution satellite images to monitor coral reefs and bleaching events.

Organization
CORAL is a nonprofit 501(c)(3) organization. They are funded by individual donors, foundations, and corporate and government grants. In 2021, CORAL raised more than $4 million in total revenue, from individual and corporate contributions ($1.3 million) as well as foundation and government grants ($2.7 million).

See also 

 Coral bleaching
 Coral reef protection

References

International environmental organizations
Diving organizations